Sang A Im-Propp (Korean name: Im Sang-a, Hangul: 임상아, Hanja: 林尚雅; born February 25, 1973) is a New York City-based fashion designer and former pop singer from South Korea. She founded the luxury handbag brand, Sang A, in 2006.

Career 
Im-Propp debuted as a singer in South Korea in 1996 with the album, Musical, which included the hit song of the same name. She released two more albums before deciding, during a visit to New York City, to leave the music industry and to pursue a career in fashion. She later studied at Parsons School of Design and interned under designer and stylist Victoria Bartlett.

Im-Propp launched her handbag company, Sang-A, in 2006. In 2007, she was awarded the Samsung Fashion Design Fund Award, and, in 2010, she was inducted into the Council of Fashion Designers of America.

References

External links
 

1973 births
Living people
South Korean pop singers
South Korean fashion designers
South Korean emigrants to the United States
21st-century South Korean singers
21st-century South Korean women singers
South Korean women fashion designers
Pungcheon Im clan